Kurnia Meiga Hermansyah (born 7 May 1990) is an Indonesian former footballer who played as a goalkeeper. He is also the younger brother of former goalkeeper Achmad Kurniawan, who also played for Arema. 

In 2008-09 Indonesia Super League he received 12 months of sanctions and 30 million fine from Football Association of Indonesia, which was reduced later to five months and 30 million fine, related to the incident against Bontang. In 2009-2010, he was crowned as the best player to set aside the names like Aldo Barreto, Cristian Gonzáles, and Ricardo Salampessy.

In 2017 Liga 1 middle season, he had to go out of action from football due to being diagnosed with Papilledema.

International career
Meiga first called up for senior team in 2010 AFF Suzuki Cup as third choice goalkeeper behind Markus Haris Maulana and Ferry Rotinsulu. He received his senior debut against Saudi Arabia in 2015 AFC Asian Cup qualification and he conceded 2 goals. Later he made his second caps against Netherlands he made some brilliant saves at first half before he conceded 3 goals by Siem de Jong twice and Arjen Robben.

National team

Honours

Club
Arema
Indonesia Super League (1): 2009–10
East Java Governor Cup (1): 2013
Menpora Cup (1): 2013
Indonesian Inter Island Cup (1): 2014/15
Indonesia President's Cup (1): 2017

International
Indonesia U-23
Southeast Asian Games Silver Medal (2): 2011 and 2013
Islamic Solidarity Games Silver Medal (1): 2013
Indonesia
AFF Championship Runner-up (2): 2010 and 2016

Individual
Indonesia Super League Best Player: 2009–10
AFF Championship Best Goalkeeper: 2016
2016 AFF Championship: Best Eleven
 ASEAN Football Federation Best XI: 2017'''

References

External links
EuroSport Profile

1990 births
Living people
Betawi people
Sportspeople from Jakarta
Association football goalkeepers
Indonesian footballers
Arema F.C. players
Liga 1 (Indonesia) players
Indonesian Super League-winning players
Indonesia youth international footballers
Indonesia international footballers
Southeast Asian Games silver medalists for Indonesia
Southeast Asian Games medalists in football
Competitors at the 2011 Southeast Asian Games
Competitors at the 2013 Southeast Asian Games